The 1995 East Texas State Lions football team represented East Texas State University—now known as Texas A&M University–Commerce—as a member of the Lone Star Conference (LSC) during the 1995 NCAA Division II football season.  Led by tenth-year head coach Eddie Vowell, the Lions compiled an overall record of  8–4 with a mark of 6–1  in conference play, placing second in the LSC. East Texas State advanced to the NCAA Division II Football Championship playoffs, where they lost in the first round . The team played home games at Memorial Stadium in Commerce, Texas.

Schedule

Awards

All-Americans
Kevin Mathis, Cornerback, First Team
Daryl Anderson, Wide Receiver, Second Team 
Chris Dolan, Punter, Second Team
David Dell, Placekicker, Second Team
Travis Marshall, Defensive End, Third Team
Jason Smith, Running Back, Honorable Mention

All-Lone Star Conference

LSC Superlatives
David Dell, Freshman of The Year

LSC First Team
Daryl Anderson, Wide Receiver
David Dell, Kicker
Chris Dolan, Punter 
Kevin Mathis, Cornerback 
Jason Smith, Running Back

LSC Second Team
Trent Dagen, Tight End
Jason Hoffman, Center
Travis Marshall, Defensive End
Carl Walker, Defensive Line

LSC Honorable Mention
Ralph Bennett, Offensive Tackle
James Epps, Wide Receiver
Chandler Evans, Quarterback
Manuel Evans, Defensive Back
Steve Holland, Safety 
Donnie Jones, Safety 
Derrick Kazee, Linebacker
Michael Rose, Defensive Tackle
Jim Suiter, Offensive Tackle  
Chris Taylor, Linebacker
Greg Watson, Wide Receiver
Tim Wheeler, Defensive Tackle

References

East Texas State
Texas A&M–Commerce Lions football seasons
East Texas State Football